The India A cricket team toured West Indies from July till August 2019 to play three First-class matches and 5 List-A matches.

India A won the List-A (unofficial ODI) series by a 4-1 margin. They also won the First-class (unofficial Test) series by 2-0.

List-A series

1st Unofficial ODI

2nd Unofficial ODI

3rd Unofficial ODI

4th Unofficial ODI

5th Unofficial ODI

First-Class series

1st Unofficial Test

2nd Unofficial Test

3rd Unofficial Test

External links
 Tournament homepage at Cricket West Indies website
 homepage at ESPNcricinfo

References 

A team cricket
2019 in Indian cricket